Canadian maple may refer to:
 Acer saccharum, a hardwood common in Northern America
 Canadian Gold Maple Leaf, the official bullion gold coin of Canada